Sister Margaret may refer to:

 Sister Margaret Farley (21st century), American Roman Catholic nun
 Sister Margaret Sinclair (1900-1925), Scottish Roman Catholic nun
 Sister Margaret McKenna (born 1940), American Medical Mission Sister